Heido Vitsur (born 28 March 1944 Tartu) is an Estonian economist and politician. In 1992, he was Minister of Economy. He was a member of VII Riigikogu.

References

Living people
1944 births
20th-century Estonian economists
Estonian Centre Party politicians
Members of the Riigikogu, 1992–1995
Economy ministers of Estonia
Recipients of the Order of the White Star, 4th Class
People from Kose Parish
21st-century Estonian economists